Julia Rosliakova (born January 5, 1975 in Moscow, Russia SSR, Soviet Union) is a retired individual rhythmic gymnast who competed for Russia.

Career 
Rosliakova began her career training in the club of SDYUSSHOR 74 and was trained under the guidance of Alla Yanina. In 1992, after the collapse of the Soviet Union, Rosliakova decided to compete for Russia and was admitted to the newly formed national team. The leader of the World team was Oxana Kostina followed by her younger teammates Amina Zaripova and Rosliakova. They won the bronze medal in team event (tied with the Spanish team) at the 1992 European Championships.

After the tragic death of Kostina, the Russian national composition was then led by Zaripova. Rosliakova along with Amina Zaripova and Inessa Gizikova competed at the 1993 World Championships in Alicante, Spain where Russia won the team bronze, she won two individual meals: a silver medal in rope and bronze in ball, she finished 8th in the all-around finals behind Spain's Carolina Pascual.

Rosliakova had appeared in three European Championships in 1992, 1993 and 1994.

References

External links
 
 Julia Rosliakova at Gimnastika.pro 

1975 births
Living people
Russian rhythmic gymnasts
Gymnasts from Moscow
Medalists at the Rhythmic Gymnastics World Championships
Medalists at the Rhythmic Gymnastics European Championships